Augustine Simo (born 18 September 1978) is a Cameroonian former professional footballer who played as midfielder.

He played for several clubs in Europe, including AS Saint-Étienne in France and AC Lugano, Neuchâtel Xamax, FC Zürich, FC Aarau, and Urania Genève Sport in Switzerland.

He was a member of the Cameroon national team which participated in 1998 FIFA World Cup. He also played at the 1995 FIFA World Youth Championship in Qatar.

References

External links
 
 

1978 births
Living people
People from West Region (Cameroon)
Association football midfielders
Cameroonian footballers
Cameroon international footballers
Cameroon under-20 international footballers
1998 FIFA World Cup players
1996 African Cup of Nations players
1998 African Cup of Nations players
Aigle Royal Menoua players
Torino F.C. players
FC Lugano players
AS Saint-Étienne players
Neuchâtel Xamax FCS players
FC Zürich players
FC Aarau players
Urania Genève Sport players
Hapoel Petah Tikva F.C. players
Serie A players
Swiss Super League players
Ligue 2 players
Cameroonian expatriate footballers
Cameroonian expatriate sportspeople in Italy
Expatriate footballers in Italy
Cameroonian expatriate sportspeople in Israel
Expatriate footballers in Israel
Cameroonian expatriate sportspeople in France
Expatriate footballers in France
Cameroonian expatriate sportspeople in Switzerland
Expatriate footballers in Switzerland